The Baluarte River, (Rio del Baluarte) is a river of Mexico in the states of Durango and Sinaloa, traversing 142 km, part of which forms the border between these two states. 

 
The portion of the river, near Concordia in Sinaloa, is spanned by the Durango–Mazatlán highway via the Baluarte Bridge - the highest cable-stayed bridge in the world.

See also
List of rivers of Mexico
List of rivers of the Americas by coastline

References

Atlas of Mexico, 1975 (http://www.lib.utexas.edu/maps/atlas_mexico/river_basins.jpg).

Rivers of Sinaloa
Rivers of Mexico